ERCC excision repair 6 like, spindle assembly checkpoint helicase is a protein that in humans is encoded by the ERCC6L gene.

Function
This gene encodes a member of the SWItch/Sucrose Non-Fermentable (SWI/SNF2) family of proteins, and contains a SNF2-like ATPase domain and a PICH family domain. One distinguishing feature of this SWI/SNF protein family member is that during interphase, the protein is excluded from the nucleus, and only associates with chromatin after the nuclear envelope has broken down. This protein is a DNA translocase that is thought to bind double-stranded DNA that is exposed to stretching forces, such as those exerted by the mitotic spindle. This protein associates with ribosomal DNA and ultra-fine DNA bridges (UFBs), fine structures that connect sister chromatids during anaphase at some sites such as fragile sites, telomeres and centromeres. This gene is required for the faithful segregation of sister chromatids during mitosis, and the ATPase activity of this protein required for the resolution of UFBs before cytokinesis.

References

Further reading